Sweet potato latent virus (SPLV), formerly designated as sweet potato virus N, was first reported from Taiwan. The virus has flexuous, filamentous particles of approximately 700-750 nm long and induces typical cylindrical inclusion proteins in the cytoplasm of infected cells. The experimental host range of SPLV is wider than that of sweet potato feathery virus (SPFMV), and it induces symptoms on some Chenopodium and Nicotiana species. SPLV is serologically related to, but distinct from SPFMV. Sequence comparison of the 3’-partial sequences showed that SPLV was a distinct species of the genus Potyvirus in the family Potyviridae. The virus is common in China and has also been found in Korea and Rwanda.

References

Further reading
 Rossel HW, Thottappilly G, 1988. Complex virus diseases of sweet potato. In: Exploration, Maintenance and Utilisation of Sweet Potato Genetic Resources. Report of first Sweet Potato planning Conference 1987. International Potato Centre, Lima, Peru, pp 291–302.

External links
ICTVdB - The Universal Virus Database: Sweet potato latent virus
Family Groups - The Baltimore Method

Viral plant pathogens and diseases
Potyviruses
Sweet potatoes